Banteer railway station is a station on the Mallow to Tralee railway line and serves the village of Banteer in County Cork, Ireland. It is the next adjacent station to Kanturk, County Cork.

The station opened on 16 April 1853 and was closed for goods traffic on 2 September 1976.

The  branch to Newmarket closed to passengers in 1944, reopened for a year in 1946, then carried only occasional livestock trains until CIÉ applied to close it in 1954.

References

External links
Irish Rail Banteer Station Website 

Iarnród Éireann stations in County Cork
Railway stations in County Cork
Railway stations opened in 1853
Kanturk
Railway stations in the Republic of Ireland opened in 1853